The following lists events that happened in 1992 in Iceland.

Incumbents
President – Vigdís Finnbogadóttir 
Prime Minister – Davíð Oddsson

Events

Vigdís Finnbogadóttir is re-elected as President

Births

30 March – Ólafur Karl Finsen, footballer
15 April – Guðmundur Þórarinsson, footballer.
18 May – Haukur Pálsson, basketball player
25 May – Jón Daði Böðvarsson, footballer
27 may – Frida Einarsdottir, artistic gymnast
2 June – Þorgerður Anna Atladóttir, handball player
1 July – Ásgeir Trausti, musician
5 August – Guðmundur Hólmar Helgason, handball player
12 August – Arna Ásgrímsdóttir, footballer
8 October – Agnes Suto, artistic gymnast
18 October – Dominiqua Belanyi, artistic gymnast

Deaths

1 September – Árni Böðvarsson, educator, grammarian, and dictionary editor (b. 1924)
26 December – Sigríður Hagalín, actress (b. 1926)
31 December – Kristján Vattnes, athlete (b. 1916).

References

 
1990s in Iceland
Iceland
Iceland
Years of the 20th century in Iceland